Clemensia parapatella is a moth of the family Erebidae first described by Paul Dognin in 1899. It is found in Ecuador.

References

Cisthenina
Moths described in 1899